Rui Fernando da Costa Riça, known as Rui Riça (born 6 January 1978) is a retired Portuguese football player. He was mainly a goalkeeper, but occasionally played as a defender and scored in those games.

Club career
He made his professional debut in the Segunda Liga for Chaves on 2 October 1999 in a game against Sporting Covilhã.

References

1978 births
People from Chaves, Portugal
Living people
Portuguese footballers
G.D. Chaves players
CD Ourense footballers
Portuguese expatriate footballers
Portuguese expatriate sportspeople in Spain
Expatriate footballers in Spain
Liga Portugal 2 players
F.C. Vizela players
C.D. Trofense players
C.F. Os Belenenses players
F.C. Penafiel players
S.C. Vila Real players
C.D.C. Montalegre players
Association football goalkeepers
Association football defenders
Sportspeople from Vila Real District